Whisper of Waves is a fantasy novel by Philip Athans, set in the world of the Forgotten Realms, and based on the Dungeons & Dragons role-playing game. It is the first novel in "The Watercouse Trilogy". It was published in paperback in November 2005.

Plot summary
Whisper of Waves tells the story of three characters. A wizard who was pledged to the Red Wizards of Thay from boyhood makes plans in another dimension, and is willing to do anything for anyone who can give him more power. A genasi senator has fought his way up from the streets, and amid the tangled streets of Innarlith, he mixes his ambition with thoughts of vengeance. As a master builder walks along the coast of Faerûn, the waves seem to whisper to him of a mighty task worthy of his talents.

Reception
In a mostly positive review, Don D'Ammassa wrote that the novel is "a fairly entertaining adventure".

References

2005 American novels
Forgotten Realms novels
Novels by Philip Athans